Melbourne West Province was an electorate of the Victorian Legislative Council from 1904 until 2006.

It was created in June 1904 when Melbourne Province was reduced in size (four members down to two), North Yarra Province and South Yarra Province were abolished. The new Melbourne West Province, Melbourne North Province, Melbourne South Province and Melbourne East Province were then created. 
Its area was defined by the Electoral Provinces Boundaries Act 1903 as: 

Melbourne West Province was abolished at the 2006 state election in the wake of the Bracks Labor government's reform of the Legislative Council.

Members for Melbourne West Province

Election results

References

 http://www.parliament.vic.gov.au/re-member/bioregsearch.cfm

Former electoral provinces of Victoria (Australia)
1904 establishments in Australia
2006 disestablishments in Australia